Brett Flemming (born February 26, 1991) is a Canadian former professional ice hockey defenceman. He is currently playing senior men's hockey with the Wentworth Gryphins, competing for the Allan Cup. Flemming was selected by the Washington Capitals in the 5th round (145th overall) of the 2009 NHL Entry Draft.

Playing career
Flemming played major junior hockey in the Ontario Hockey League (OHL) with the Mississauga St. Michael's Majors.

On December 2, 2010, the Capitals signed Flemming to a three-year entry-level contract. He made his professional debut in the American Hockey League with the Hershey Bears during the 2011–12 season.

After three seasons within the Capitals' minor league affiliates, Flemming left as a free agent and on August 6, 2014, and signed a one-year contract with the Lehigh Valley Phantoms of the AHL.

On September 1, 2015, Flemming signed his first contract abroad, agreeing to a one-year contract with Italian outfit, HCB South Tyrol of the Austrian EBEL. He produced 26 points in 54 games from the blueline for Bolzano in the 2015–16 season. As a free agent following the year, Flemming continued his European career in agreeing to a one-year deal with Czech club, Piráti Chomutov of the Czech Extraliga (ELH), on May 9, 2016.

Following the completion of the 2021–22 season with EC VSV, Flemming announced his retirement from professional hockey after 11 professional seasons on April 26, 2022.

Career statistics

Regular season and playoffs

International

References

External links
 

1991 births
Living people
Bolzano HC players
Canadian ice hockey defencemen
Hershey Bears players
Ice hockey people from Saskatchewan
Lehigh Valley Phantoms players
Mississauga St. Michael's Majors players
Piráti Chomutov players
Reading Royals players
South Carolina Stingrays players
Sportspeople from Regina, Saskatchewan
Vienna Capitals players
EC VSV players
Washington Capitals draft picks
Canadian expatriate ice hockey players in the United States
Canadian expatriate ice hockey players in the Czech Republic
Canadian expatriate ice hockey players in Austria
Canadian expatriate ice hockey players in Italy